Blow Your Whistle: Original Old School Breaks & Classic Funk Bombs is a greatest hits album by American go-go and soul band The Soul Searchers. The album was released on February 19, 2007 and consists of a compilation of twelve digitally remastered songs from the group's two previously released albums (We the People and Salt of the Earth).

Track listing

Personnel 
Chuck Brown – electric guitar, lead vocals
John Enwell – bass guitar
Kenneth Scoggins – drums
Lino A. Druitt – congas, percussion
Lloyd Pinchback – flute, saxophone, percussion
John "JB" Buchanan – trombone, piano, synthesizer, vocals
Hilton C. Selton Jr. – organ
Horace Brock – organ
Bennie Braxton – organ, vocals
Donald Tillery – trumpet, percussion, vocals
James Maycock – compilation assembly, liner notes

References 

2007 compilation albums
Chuck Brown albums